Ira Thomson Carrithers (October 25, 1886 – February 17, 1955) was an American football and basketball coach.  He served as the head football coach at Alma College (1908–1909), Knox College in Galesburg, Illinois (1910–1912), and Lake Forest College (1914), compiling a career college football record of  22–17.  Carrither was also the head basketball coach at Knox (1910–1913), Lake Forest (1914–1915, 1929–1932), and Coe College (1915–1924), amassing a career college basketball mark of 91–118.

Coaching career

Coe
Carrithers became athletic director and coach of several sports at Coe College.  From 1915 to 1924, Coe became nationally recognized for its competitive sports under Carrithers.  He was inducted into the schools "athletic hall of fame" in 1973.

References

1886 births
1955 deaths
American football halfbacks
Alma Scots football coaches
Baseball outfielders
Basketball coaches from Illinois
Coe Kohawks athletic directors
Coe Kohawks baseball coaches
Coe Kohawks football coaches
Coe Kohawks men's basketball coaches
College men's basketball head coaches in the United States
College men's track and field athletes in the United States
Illinois Fighting Illini baseball players
Illinois Fighting Illini football coaches
Illinois Fighting Illini football players
Knox Prairie Fire football coaches
Knox Prairie Fire men's basketball coaches
Lake Forest Foresters football coaches
Lake Forest Foresters men's basketball coaches
People from Washburn, Illinois
Players of American football from Illinois
Sportspeople from Pontiac, Michigan